is a Japanese actor and voice actor, known for starring in Shin Godzilla, Attack on Titan, and Attack on Titan: End of the World. A television series based on Matsuo's life titled Lost Man Found was released in 2022.

Filmography

Film

Television

References

External links
SATORU MATSUO – IMDb

1975 births
Living people
People from Amagasaki
Japanese male actors
21st-century Japanese male actors
People from Hyōgo Prefecture
Japanese film actors